Pedro Jorge Marques Pereira (born 3 January 1984) is a Portuguese footballer who plays for Grupo Desportivo Prado as a right winger.

Over nine seasons, he amassed Segunda Liga totals of 268 matches and 38 goals, mainly with Aves (six years). He totalled 50 appearances in the Primeira Liga, with three clubs.

Club career
Born in Braga, Pereira joined local S.C. Braga's youth system at the age of 11. He spent four full seasons with the reserves to kickstart his senior career and, on 17 August 2003, he made his first and only Primeira Liga appearance with the first team, coming on as a 77th-minute substitute in a 0–2 away loss against FC Porto; additionally, he spent time with farm team F.C. Vizela in the Segunda Liga.

Subsequently, Pereira was sparingly used during two top-division seasons at C.F. Estrela da Amadora, being relegated in 2009 due to financial irregularities. He scored the first of his two goals in the competition on 7 January 2008, to close a 4–1 home win over Vitória de Guimarães.

In the following eight years, safe for an unassuming spell at Gil Vicente F.C. in the top flight, Pereira competed in the second tier, with C.D. Aves, S.C. Freamunde and AD Fafe. In the 2013–14 campaign, he scored a career-best 12 goals in 43 games to help the first club to a final fourth position (15 across all competitions).

References

External links

1984 births
Living people
Sportspeople from Braga
Portuguese footballers
Association football wingers
Primeira Liga players
Liga Portugal 2 players
Segunda Divisão players
S.C. Braga B players
S.C. Braga players
F.C. Vizela players
C.F. Estrela da Amadora players
C.D. Aves players
Gil Vicente F.C. players
S.C. Freamunde players
AD Fafe players
Merelinense F.C. players
Vilaverdense F.C. players
Portugal youth international footballers